The black-backed butterflyfish or blackback butterflyfish (Chaetodon melannotus) is a species of butterflyfish (family Chaetodontidae). It is widespread through the Indo-Pacific area from the Red Sea and East Africa to Samoa, to southern Japan and throughout Micronesia.

This fish grows up to 18 cm (ca. 7 in) long, and may live for up to 20 years. When observed at night or when frightened, this species changes color; the dorsal portion of the body turns black except for two white patches.

It belongs to the large subgenus Rabdophorus which might warrant recognition as a distinct genus. In this group, it appears a close relative of the spot-tailed butterflyfish (C. ocellicaudus) and somewhat less close to the yellow-dotted butterflyfish (C. selene). These are all of oval shape, silvery with yellow fins and snout, ascending diagonal stripes, and black markings around the eyes, on the caudal peduncle, and sometimes on the back. Next closest seem the saddle butterflyfish (C. ephippium) and the dotted butterflyfish (C. semeion), but these are already so distant that their ancestors must have diverged from those soon after the Rabdophorus lineage started to diversify.

These oviparous fish are common on staghorn coral thickets, they are less seen on exposed parts of reefs. Black-backed butterflyfish are generally found between 4 and 20 m deep, usually solitary, in pairs during the breeding season. Juveniles are more commonly found inshore, in pairs or traveling in small groups. It feeds primarily on the polyps of soft and hard corals. The Black-backed Butterflyfish is easy to maintain in the aquarium by the standards of its genus.

References

External links
 

Chaetodon
Fish of the Red Sea
Taxa named by Marcus Elieser Bloch
Taxa named by Johann Gottlob Theaenus Schneider